Aleksandar Mitrović (born 1994) is a Serbian footballer.

Aleksandar Mitrović may also refer to:
 Aleksandar Mitrović (politician) (1933–2012), Serbian politician
 Aleksandar Mitrović (volleyball) (born 1982), Serbian volleyball player
 Aleksandar Mitrović (basketball) (born 1990), Serbian basketball player